In crystallography, the monoclinic crystal system is one of the seven crystal systems.  A crystal system is described by three vectors. In the monoclinic system, the crystal is described by vectors of unequal lengths, as in the orthorhombic system. They form a parallelogram prism. Hence two pairs of vectors are perpendicular (meet at right angles), while the third pair makes an angle other than 90°.

Bravais lattices

Two monoclinic Bravais lattices exist: the primitive monoclinic and the base-centered monoclinic.

For the base-centered monoclinic lattice, the primitive cell has the shape of an oblique rhombic prism; it can be constructed because the two-dimensional centered rectangular base layer can also be described with primitive rhombic axes. Note that the length  of the primitive cell below equals  of the conventional cell above.

Crystal classes

The table below organizes the space groups of the monoclinic crystal system by crystal class. It lists the International Tables for Crystallography space group numbers, followed by the crystal class name, its point group in Schoenflies notation, Hermann–Mauguin (international) notation, orbifold notation, and Coxeter notation, type descriptors, mineral examples, and the notation for the space groups.

Sphenoidal is also called monoclinic hemimorphic, domatic is also called monoclinic hemihedral, and prismatic is also called monoclinic normal.

The three monoclinic hemimorphic space groups are as follows:
 a prism with as cross-section wallpaper group p2
 ditto with screw axes instead of axes
 ditto with screw axes as well as axes, parallel, in between; in this case an additional translation vector is one half of a translation vector in the base plane plus one half of a perpendicular vector between the base planes.

The four monoclinic hemihedral space groups include
 those with pure reflection at the base of the prism and halfway
 those with glide planes instead of pure reflection planes; the glide is one half of a translation vector in the base plane
 those with both in between each other; in this case an additional translation vector is this glide plus one half of a perpendicular vector between the base planes.

In two dimensions 

The only monoclinic Bravais lattice in two dimensions is the oblique lattice.

See also
Crystal structure
Crystal system

References

Further reading
 

Crystal systems